Karita Bekkemellem (born 15 January 1965 in Lillehammer) is a Norwegian politician. She belongs to the Norwegian Labour Party, where she leads the women's network.

Karita Bekkemellem was the Minister of Children and Families in Jens Stoltenberg's short-lived 2000-2001 cabinet, and also Minister of Children and Equality Affairs in the second cabinet Stoltenberg from 2005 to 2007. She is in her fifth period of representing the county of Møre og Romsdal. In the period from 2001 to 2005 she served as faction leader in the committee for church, education and research affairs.

Her autobiography Mitt røde hjerte (My Red Heart) was published in 2009. In this book, Bekkemellem described the circumstances surrounding her departure from the cabinet in 2007. She also described her childhood where her father had accidentally killed a girlfriend and turned to alcohol. She also wrote about her survival of a suicide attempt in 1992. It was also revealed that she in 1983, when she was 18, had voted for the right-wing Progress Party, though this was apparently based more on her liking of the politician Lodve Solholm than the actual politics of the party.

References

External links
Official presentation

Ministers of Children, Equality and Social Inclusion of Norway
1965 births
Living people
Labour Party (Norway) politicians
Members of the Storting
Women members of the Storting
Ministers for children, young people and families
21st-century Norwegian politicians
21st-century Norwegian women politicians
20th-century Norwegian politicians
20th-century Norwegian women politicians
Women government ministers of Norway